Xiaomi Mi MIX 2S is an Android phablet manufactured by Xiaomi. Xiaomi unveiled a new version of the Mi MIX 2, the Mi MIX 2S, on 27 March 2018. Powered by the Qualcomm Snapdragon 845, it features the same  1080p IPS LCD display found on the Mi MIX 2, a new dual 12 MP camera,  Qi wireless charging, and is pre-loaded with Android 8.0 Oreo.
The Mi MIX 2S received a score of 97 on DxOMark.

Reception 

In August 2017, Mi MIX 2S was awarded the IDEA Gold Award for its design.

In reviews, the general feedback was favorable, with critics praising the more accessible elements of it over the original Mi MIX such as worldwide LTE bands, a lower price than the original Mi MIX, a smaller display and a traditional earpiece speaker to replace the piezoelectric speaker in the original Mi Mix. 

However, users (especially in France) report that the phone has issues managing 4G/4G+ connections. While connected to the 4G network, the phone has issues in handling the handover between cells, which disconnects the internet and it needs several seconds for the connection to be restored (even though the phone indicates strong signal and connection). Web pages do not load, VoIP calls (Whatsapp and Viber, etc.) get disconnected. Issue was fixed by software update

Android 9.0 "Pie" was released for the Mi MIX 2S on 30 October 2018.

Android 10.0 "Q" together with MIUI 11 was released for the Mi MIX 2S by end of 2019, and on 2020 was updated to MIUI 12. In Q3 2021 MI MIX was updated to MIUI 12.5

References

External links 
 

Android (operating system) devices
Phablets
Mobile phones introduced in 2018
Mobile phones with multiple rear cameras
Mobile phones with 4K video recording
Discontinued flagship smartphones
Xiaomi smartphones